Clarkstown High School South is a public high school located in West Nyack, New York, United States. The school educates students in grades 9 through 12, and is one of two high schools in the Clarkstown Central School District (CCSD). It is commonly referred to as Clarkstown South, or simply "South."

In 2013, Clarkstown South was ranked in Newsweek's list of the 2000 best public high schools in the United States.

In 2016, Clarkstown South was ranked in Newsweek's list of the 500 top high schools in the United States, ranking 167th place.

In 2017, Clarkstown South was a part of State Education Commissioner Elia's list of 185 reward schools.

In 2018, Clarkstown South was recognized in the National Rankings and earned a silver medal based on their performance on state-required tests and how well they prepare students for college.

School facilities
Clarkstown South building consists of a main lobby, large auditorium, gymnasium (including a wrestling room and a fitness center), music wing, planetarium, two lunchrooms, and three floors of classrooms. In the fall of 2005, a planetarium was built in the rear of the building.  A greenhouse was also constructed in 2006. South offers many music ensembles, including chorus, orchestra, concert band, and marching band.

School groups
The Vikings are also known for their success in many of their school groups. Clarkstown South takes pride in Junior Statesmen of America, DECA, National History Day, United Service Organization/Veterans Affairs Club, Mock Trial Team 2016 Westchester/Rockland County Champions, VAASA (Varsity Athletes Against Substance Abuse), and Mu Alpha Theta chapter because of the many awards they bring home to their school.

The school hosted the Clarkstown Summer Theatre Festival since its inception in 1973 until its last season in 2010. Subsequently, it hosted the Hudson Valley Teen Summer Theatre program.

School activities and clubs
Clarkstown South offers a variety of activities and clubs for the students to enjoy. The clubs at South cater to all kinds of students, whether their interests are art, music, math, science, etc. Some of the clubs they have are the Mural Club, South Beat, TV Club, ASMA, World Language Club, Viking Radio, and more.

Notable alumni 
 Corey Baker (born 1989), baseball pitcher
 Mat Devine (born 1974), Lead Singer Of Kill Hannah, Actor, Author
 Thomas Fitton (Class of 1986), American activist, President of Judicial Watch
 Ryan Grant, NFL running back
 Allison Hagendorf (born 1979), Television personality, music journalist
 Cindy Jebb (Class of 1978), Brigadier General, USA and first female Dean of the United States Military Academy at West Point
 Patrick Kivlehan (born 1989), baseball outfielder
 Raffi Krikorian (Class of 1996), CTO for the Emerson Collective, Former CTO of the Democratic Party, and Former VP of Platform Engineering at Twitter
 Glyph Lefkowitz (Class of 1998) Creator of the Twisted framework for the Python programming language
 Jay Leiderman (Class of 1989), American criminal defense lawyer, book author 
 Joseph Pisani (Class of 1989), artist and photographer
 Justin Richardson (Class of 1981), psychiatrist and author

References

Public high schools in New York (state)
Schools in Rockland County, New York